This page features a list of awards and nominations received by Greek-Cypriot singer-songwriter and actress Anna Vissi. Since making her professional music debut in 1973 Vissi has released 26 studio albums: As Kanoume Apopse Mian Arhi (1978), Kitrino Galazio (1979), Nai (1980), Anna Vissi (1981), Eimai To Simera Kai Eisai To Chthes (1982), Na 'Hes Kardia (1984), Kati Simveni (1985), I Epomeni Kinisi (1986), Tora (1988), Empnefsi! (1988), Fotia (1989), Eimai (1990), Emeis (1992) (with Nikos Karvelas), Lambo (1992),  Re! (1994), O! Kypros (1995), Klima Tropiko (1996), Travma (1997), Antidoto (1998), Everything I Am (2000), Kravgi (2000), Chi (2002), Paraksenes Eikones (2003), Nylon (2005), Apagorevmeno (2008), and Agapi Einai Esi (2010). She has also released two live albums: Live! (1993) and Live (2004). Vissi had her biggest commercial success with Fotia, followed by the double Kravgi, which is the best-selling album of the 2000s (decade) in Greece and eighth best-selling of all time in terms of units, while five other albums —Kitrino Galazio, I Epomeni Kinisi, Klima Tropiko, Travma, and Antidoto— have achieved six-figure shipments. These albums have been released on Minos (1973–78), EMI Greece (1979–82), CarVi (1982), and Sony Music Entertainment Greece (1983–present). She has released material abroad on Moda Records.

Vissi and her family moved to Greece after she won a national talent competition in Cyprus, which was followed by her debut at the Thessaloniki Song Festival where she was awarded the top prizes for "Best Vocals" and "Best Composition" for the song "As Kanoume Apopse Mian Arhi" in 1978. This led to her recording multiple promo singles, collaborating with well-known producers, and releasing a debut album of the same name. In the 1980s, Vissi became a prominent figure in Greek music and participated in the Eurovision Song Contest in 1980 for Greece and 1982 for Cyprus, finishing 13th and fifth respectively. While her first performance was not a success, her second remains the highest placement that Cyprus has earned in the Contest. Vissi returned to the Contest in 2006 finishing ninth, however, she later regretted her latest performance, calling it a "big mistake".

Vissi's popularity culminated in the mid-1990s to the mid-2000s (decade), becoming a prominent performer of the laiko-pop genre reigning at the time. The first annual music awards were materialized in Greece with the launch of the Pop Corn Music Awards; in 1996 Vissi won three awards for her album Klima Tropiko. She was further awarded a record eight awards for Travma in 1998 and a further five awards for Kravgi in 2000, while she won the Song of the Decade honour in 1999 for "Den Thelo Na Xereis". With a total of 22 awards, she became one of the most-awarded artists in the awards' history and received honors for Best Female Artist, Best Female Vocal Performance, Best Female Stage Performance, Best Song, and Best Album. Vissi has also received four Cyprus Music Awards, seven Arion Music Awards, including three for "Video of the Year", and a Life & Style Women of the Year Award, while she has also won nine MAD Video Music Awards in eight different categories, and set the record for most awards won in one night with four honours at the first ceremony in 2004. Apart from these Vissi has been honoured for her contribution to contemporary Greek music at the Balkan Music Awards and Hellenic Charity Ball. She has been nominated for awards in laïko, contemporary laïko, pop, dance and hip hop categories and has won 48 recognized awards from over 70 nominations.

This list includes only recognized awards and not polls and other awards. Also, the list may be incomplete due to the lack of sources on Greek awards prior to 2000.

Arion Music Awards
The Arion Music Awards are the official Greek music industry awards by IFPI Greece since 2002, after the Pop Corn Music Awards, which were organized by the Greek magazine Pop Corn from 1997 to 2001, were discontinued. The Arions were broadcast by Mega Channel in their first five years before moving to ANT1 channel. The awards have not been held since 2007 for various reasons. Vissi has won seven awards.

Balkan Music Awards
The Balkan Music Awards were established in 2010 by Balkanica Music Television and are held annually in different cities of the Balkans. The awards honour outstanding achievements for Balkan artists in the recording industry. Vissi has won two awards from three nominations. In the first year she received an honorary award for "exceptional contribution to the development and popularisation of the Balkan music".

Cyprus Music Awards
The Cyprus Music Awards are the official Cypriot music awards, held by Cyprus College in Nicosia, Cyprus in 2006 and 2007 before being cancelled. Vissi has won four awards from four nominations.

Eurovision awards

Eurovision Song Contest
The Eurovision Song Contest is an annual competition held among active member countries of the EBU. The contest, which has been broadcast every year since its début in 1956, is one of the longest-running television programs and most watched in the world. Vissi represented Greece on two occasions in 1980 and 2006, and represented her native Cyprus in 1982. She has finished 13th, fifth, and ninth from three participations.

Marcel Bezençcon Awards
The Marcel Bezençon Awards were first handed out during the Eurovision Song Contest 2002 in Tallinn, Estonia honouring the best competing songs in the final. Founded by Christer Björkman (Sweden's representative in the Eurovision Song Contest 1992 and current Head of Delegation for Sweden) and Richard Herrey (member of the Herreys, Eurovision Song Contest 1984 winner from Sweden), the awards are named after the creator of the annual competition, Marcel Bezençon. The awards are divided into 3 categories: Press Award — given to the best entry as voted on by the accredited media and press during the event; Artistic Award — presented to the best artist as voted on by the commentators; and Composer Award — a jury consisting of the participating composers vote for the best and most original composition. Vissi has received three nominations.

Hellenic Charity Ball
The Hellenic Charity Ball was established in 1997 and is held every other year in San Francisco, California to honour "the brightest arts and entertainment luminaries in the Greek-American community". Vissi was one of four inductees in 2011.

Life & Style Women of the Year Awards
The Life & Style Women of the Year Awards is an annual awards show established in 2003 by the women's interest magazine Life & Style as an equivalent to the Status Men of the Year Awards to honour women who have excelled within various fields, including arts, entertainment, journalism, politics, and science. Vissi has won one award.

Pop Corn Music Awards
The Pop Corn Music Awards that were held by the music magazine Pop Corn from 1992 until 2001, televised on Alpha TV. The awards were the first organized music awards show in Greece and served as the national music awards ceremony for ten years, making them the longest-running music industry awards show ever in Greece. They were voted on by the magazine's readers and industry insiders. They were replaced in 2002 by the Arion Music Awards. Vissi has won 15 awards, more than any other artist. She also won a special award at the 1999 ceremony for Song of the Decade for "Den Thelo Na Xereis".

MAD Video Music Awards
The MAD Video Music Awards are held annually in June by MAD TV since 2004. In its first two years, the awards were televised on ANT1 for non-satellite viewers, but have since moved to Alpha TV. Vissi has won nine awards from 20 nominations. The first year Vissi set the record for most awards won in a single night, having won four.

Thessaloniki Song Festival
The Thessaloniki Song Festival is an annual competition held in Thessaloniki since 1962. It is the longest-running music festival and award ceremony in Greece. There are a number of titles awarded, with the ultimate winner being the recipient of the "Best Composition" award, which made Vissi the winner of the competition. Vissi has won two awards.

References

External links
 Official site

Vissi, Anna
Anna Vissi